The  ( "New Monastery", modern Nawbahār) were two Buddhist monasteries close to the ancient city of Balkh in northern Afghanistan. Historical accounts report it as flourishing as an important centre of Buddhism between the seventh and eleventh centuries CE. It may have been founded considerably earlier, perhaps in or after the reign of the Kushan emperor Kaniṣka, in the second century CE.

Rise to prominence

Historical accounts report it as flourishing as an important centre of Buddhism between the seventh and eleventh centuries CE. It may have been founded considerably earlier, perhaps in or after the reign of Kaniṣka, in the second century CE.

The many Buddhist references in the Persian literature of the period also provide evidence of Islamic–Buddhist cultural contact. Persian poetry, for example, often used the simile for palaces that they were "as beautiful as a Nowbahar (Nava Vihāra)." Further, at Nava Vihāra and Bamiyan, Buddha images, particularly of Maitreya, the future Buddha, had 'moon discs' or halo iconographically represented behind or around their heads. This led to the poetic depiction of pure beauty as someone having "the moon-shaped face of a Buddha." Thus, 11th-century Persian poems, such as Varqe and Golshah by Ayyuqi, use the word budh with a positive connotation for "Buddha," not with its second, derogatory meaning as "idol." It implies the ideal of asexual beauty in both men and women. Such references indicate that either Buddhist monasteries and images were present in these Iranian cultural areas at least through the early Mongol period in the 13th century or, at minimum, that a strong Buddhist legacy remained for centuries among the Buddhist converts to Islam.

Xuanzang's report

In the Great Tang Records on the Western Regions, Xuanzang reports that at the time of his visit to Balkh in 630 there were about a hundred viharas and 30,000 monks, a large number of stupas and other religious monuments, and that Buddhism was flourishing in the Bactrian portion of the Western Turkic Khaganate. He also described it as having strong links with the Kingdom of Khotan in the Tarim Basin. The temple was led by Pramukha, Sanskrit for "leader, administrator", who, under the Arabized name of Barmak,  came to be known as the Barmakids).

History under the Arabs
The Umayyad Caliphate captured Balkh in 663 from the Kabul Shahis who had taken over the territory from the Western Turks.

In 708 Nazaktar Khan, a Kabul Shahi prince, in alliance with the Tibetan Empire, recaptured Bactria from the Umayyads and continued Buddhist rule. In 715 Qutayba recaptured the region for the Umayyads and Tibet switched sides to ally with him against the Kabul Shahis. Qutaiba inflicted heavy damage on Nava Vihāra, resulting in many monks fleeing to Khotan and Kashmir.

The Barmakids, who attained great power under the Abbasid Caliphate becoming powerful viziers, are regarded as having their origin in a line of hereditary administrators at Nava Vihāra who had converted to Islam.

An Arab author, Umar ibn al-Azraq al-Kermani, wrote a detailed account of Nava Vihāra at the beginning of the 8th century that is preserved in a later 10th-century work, the Kitab al-Buldan by Ibn al-Faqih. He described Nava Vihara in terms strikingly similar to the Kaaba in Mecca, the holiest site of Islam. He described that the main temple had a stone cube in the center, draped with cloth, and that devotees circumambulated it and made prostration, as is the case with the Kaaba. The stone cube referred to the platform on which a stupa stood, as was the custom in Bactrian temples. The cloth that draped it was in accordance with Persian custom of showing veneration that applied equally to Buddha statues as well as to stupas.

Some Arabic sources erroneously describe the vihāra as a fire temple of Zoroastrianism, presumably because of its proximity to Balkh, Zoroaster's birthplace.  In Arabic sources, the monastery's name is represented as "Naubahar". Van Bladel (p. 68) has pointed out that this version of the name can be traced to the pronunciation in the Bactrian language.

The Han Chinese pilgrim Yijing visited Nava Vihāra in the 680s and reported it flourishing as a Sarvāstivādin center of study.

Abū Rayḥān al-Bīrūnī, a Persian scholar and writer in service to the Ghaznavids, reported that around the start of the 10th century, the monasteries in Bactria, including Nava Vihāra, were still functioning and decorated with Buddhist frescoes.

A curious notice of this building is found in the writings of Arabian geographer Ibn Hawqal, an Arabian traveler of the 10th century.

See also
 Buddhas of Bamiyan
 Great Tang Records on the Western Regions
 Silk Road transmission of Buddhism
 Trapusa and Bahalika
 Balkh

References

External links
 Nava Vihāra at the Mapping Buddhist Monasteries website.

Defunct Buddhist monasteries
Ancient history of Afghanistan
Buddhism in Afghanistan
Monasteries in Afghanistan
Balkh